St Mary's Church, Redmire is a Grade II* listed parish church in the Church of England in Redmire, North Yorkshire.

History

The church dates from the 12th century. The chancel roof was restored around 1895 and the nave roof, found to be infested with Deathwatch beetle, was restored in 1925.

The royal coat of arms dates from 1720.

Parish status
The church is in a joint parish with:

Thornton Rust Mission Room
St Andrew's Church, Aysgarth
St Oswald's Church, Castle Bolton
Holy Trinity Church, Wensley
St Margaret's Church, Preston-under-Scar
St Bartholomew's Church, West Witton

Memorials
Thomas Other of Elm House (d. 1834) and Jane his wife (d. 1829), the eldest daughter of Edward Lister of Coverham Abbey

References

Redmire
Redmire